José Quintero (1924–1999) was  a Panamanian theatre director and producer.

Jose Quintero may also refer to:
 José Agustín Quintero (1829–1885), journalist, lawyer, poet, and revolutionary
 José Humberto Quintero Parra (1902–1984), Roman Catholic cardinal
 José Quintero (footballer, born 1990), Ecuadorian footballer
 José Quintero (footballer, born 2001), Venezuelan footballer
 José Quintero (fencer)  (born 1996), Venezuelan fencer